Seminary Woods is a historic woodland in St. Francis, Wisconsin, on the grounds of Saint Francis de Sales Seminary. It is one of the last surviving beech-maple mesic forests in Wisconsin. The forest was founded in 1855 when the seminary moved to St. Francis from Milwaukee and the land that was originally purchased by the Lake Drive Franciscan Sisters became part of the newly established seminary. The forest consists of 68 acres and is located near Lake Michigan. It attracts attention from naturalists for the forest's beech-maple composition and wild flowers that bloom in the spring. A striking feature of the forest is the seminary's cemetery that lies hidden among the trees.

History 
Although the woods lie on seminary property, the forest was first owned by the Sisters of St. Francis of Assisi in 1833. The land was acquired by the sisters from the Potawatomi Indians living in the area at the time. It was not until 1855 that Saint Francis de Sales Seminary was built and the forest became part of its property. The forest has survived colonization and urbanization because its natural beauty led it to be used as a place for reflection by members of the seminary.

Natural history 

The forest obtained its distinct beech-maple forest from soil deposits made by glacial movement 11,000 years ago. Several species of wildflowers, wildlife, and trees are spotted in the forest. Mature trees found in the forest include, basswood, sugar maple, beech, red oak, and paper birch. The forest also has a small stream that flows into nearby Lake Michigan. Wildflowers include, trillium, white trout lily, yellow trout lily, bloodroot, the endangered blue stemmed goldenrod, and hepatica. Wildlife found in the area include great horned owls, white tailed deer, coyotes, and migratory birds.

Invasive species 
The Wisconsin Department of Natural Resources has declared Seminary Woods an area in need of protection from invasive species because of its natural environment and historical significance. Although the forest does contain invasive species, they are low in number.

Structural remains 
In the forest are the remains of previous structures, a grotto and the cemetery that is a final resting place for individuals who were affiliated with the seminary

Seminary cemetery 

The cemetery is located towards the middle of the forest. Multiple pathways within the forest lead to the cemetery. The cemetery contains burials of sisters of St. Francis, archbishops, and children from St. Aemilian's orphanage.

Our Lady of Lourdes Grotto 

The 10-foot (3 m) grotto found in the forest near the cemetery honors Our Lady of Lourdes and was built in 1894 by Paul Dobberstein.

References

External links 
More photos of Seminary Woods
Article on Seminary Woods

1855 establishments in Wisconsin
Protected areas of Milwaukee County, Wisconsin